Jinzhou is a county-level city of Hebei Province, North China, it is under the administration of the prefecture-level city of Shijiazhuang. Until November 1991, it was known as Jin County.

It consists of nine towns and one township, as well as 224 villages.

Jinzhou has a recorded history of at least 2500 years. It was the hometown of Wei Zheng, a well-known and well-respected historical figure of Tang dynasty.  It is also, according to the Chinese government, the "duck pear town".

Administrative divisions
There are 9 towns and 1 township:

Jinzhou
Zongshizhuang
Yingli
Taoyuan
Dongzhuosu
Mayu
Xiaoqiao
Huaishu
Donglizhuang
Zhoujiazhuang Township

Climate

Transport
 G1811 Huanghua–Shijiazhuang Expressway
 China National Highway 307
 Shijiazhuang–Dezhou Railroad

References

External links
 晋州市人民政府 (Jinzhou Municipal Government)  (in Simplified Chinese) 
 晋州招商网 (Jinzhou Trade Website) (in Simplified Chinese)

County-level cities in Hebei
Shijiazhuang